Casiano Mba (born 13 June 1978) is an Equatoguinean footballer.

International career
He played with his national team against Gabon in two matches corresponding to the Africa Cup of Nations 2000 Qualifying. . He also played in the game against Congo in two matches corresponding to the World Cup 2002 Qualifying.

International goals

External links

1978 births
Living people
Equatoguinean footballers
Equatorial Guinea international footballers
Association footballers not categorized by position